Snitzer is a surname. Notable people with the surname include:

 Herb Snitzer (1932–2022), American photographer
 James G. Snitzer (1925–1945), American actor
 Miriam Snitzer (1922–1933), American actress

See also
Schnitzer